Pooja Gehlot, is an Indian freestyle wrestler. She won the bronze medal in the women's 50 kg event at the 2022 Commonwealth Games held in Birmingham, England. She also won a silver medal at the 2019 U23 World Wrestling Championships in the 53 kg category. Gehlot participated in this championship after a two year break because of a shoulder injury.

Personal life and background 

Pooja Gehlot was born on 15 March 1997 in Delhi. She showed keen interest in sports from an early age. Her uncle Dharamveer Singh was a wrestler and he started taking her to an akhara when she was about six years of age. However, her father Vijender Singh was opposed to her playing wrestling and Gehlot started playing volleyball. She went up to play at the junior national-level in volleyball. Although, her coaches thought that she was not tall enough to make an impact in the game.

Gehlot's got inspired after Geeta Phogat and Babita Kumari Phogat from Haryana won medals for India at the 2010 Commonwealth Games. The Phogat sisters' success inspired Gehlot to switch to wrestling. She began training professionally in 2014. However, the suburb of Delhi - where her family was living at the time - did not have a wrestling practice centre for girls. She found a training centre in Delhi city, which meant she had to travel three hours by bus every day to reach there and she had to wake up at 3 AM for that. However, the long distance had eventually forced her to shift to a nearby akhara and start training with boys. It was not easy for Gehlot to wrestle with boys and she felt shy wearing a singlet. The family moved to Rohtak town in Haryana to enable her access better training.

She won the national junior wrestling championship in 2016 in the 48 kg weight category. However, in the same year, she suffered an injury that kept her away from wrestling for more than year.

Professional Achievements 
Gehlot found her first success in the international arena when she won a gold medal in the Asian Junior Championship in Taiwan in 2017. 

Another major step for her was winning a silver medal at the under-23 World Wrestling Championship in the 51 kg category in Budapest, Hungary in 2019. She also became only the second Indian woman to win a silver medal in that event.

In 2022, she competed at the Yasar Dogu Tournament held in Istanbul, Turkey.

References 

1997 births
Living people
Sportswomen from Delhi
Sport wrestlers from Delhi
Indian female sport wrestlers
Wrestlers at the 2022 Commonwealth Games
Commonwealth Games medallists in wrestling
Commonwealth Games bronze medallists for India
21st-century Indian women
Medallists at the 2022 Commonwealth Games